Route 905, or Highway 905, may refer to:

Canada
 New Brunswick Route 905
 Saskatchewan Highway 905

Costa Rica
 National Route 905

United States
  (future Interstate 905)